Carolyn Quinn (born 22 July 1961 in Camberwell, London) is a British journalist best known for her work on BBC Radio 4 as a political correspondent and for presenting the Today programme and PM.

Early life
Quinn attended St Joseph's RC Primary School in Crayford, Dartford Grammar School for Girls and the University of Kent where she obtained a degree in French. She trained as a teacher, gaining a PGCE at the Institute of Education in London before becoming a French teacher at a London comprehensive school, but gave this up to be a ward clerk at Charing Cross Hospital. She joined Riverside Radio at the hospital.

Career
She freelanced before joining the Irish Post and was then selected for a BBC Local Radio trainee scheme. After training and two years at BBC Radio Solent from 1987–9, she joined BBC's political and parliamentary team at Westminster in 1989 and became a political correspondent in 1994.

For 2011–2012 she was elected Chairman of the Houses of Parliament Press Gallery, the first female holder of the post.

BBC Radio 4
Quinn was a presenter of PM from 2001 and the Today programme from 2004 to 2008, co-presenting her last programme with James Naughtie on Wednesday 26 March 2008. As the programme closed, she invoked Tony Blair's comments upon leaving office as British Prime Minister, wishing well to "friend and foe alike" and referring to a "rollercoaster", indicating that her departure from the programme may have been less than entirely amicable. She presented PM on Saturdays, and covers the weekday edition when Evan Davis is away.  She has also presented Pick of the Week several times and in January 2007 presented an edition of Woman's Hour.

Quinn became the regular presenter of Radio Four's The Westminster Hour from January 2007 following Andrew Rawnsley's departure in September 2006.

Quinn presented her last edition of PM, on 24 February 2023, announcing that she was retiring from full-time broadcasting. She also presented her last regular programme, The Westminster Hour two days later on 26 February, after hosting the programme for 16 years.

Personal life
Carolyn Quinn married Nigel Morris, Political Editor of the i newspaper, and former political correspondent of the Daily Mirror, in Richmond upon Thames in June 2003.

She received an honorary doctorate from the University of Kent in 2013.

References

External links
 
 BBC Profile 
 Independent May 2006
 BBC Biography 
 The Observer January 2007

Audio clips
 Interviewing Lord Andrew Philips in 2007

1961 births
Alumni of the University of Kent
BBC newsreaders and journalists
British political journalists
Living people
British people of Irish descent
People from Camberwell
People from Dartford
Alumni of the UCL Institute of Education
People educated at Dartford Grammar School for Girls
BBC Radio 4 presenters